Değirmitaş, historically and still informally called Kastel, is a village in the Yavuzeli District, Gaziantep Province, Turkey. The village is inhabited by Turkmens of the Qiziq tribe.

References

Villages in Yavuzeli District